Panama Sugar is a 1990 Italian comedy film directed by Marcello Avallone and starring by Scott Plank and Oliver Reed.

Plot
On an idyllic Caribbean island, Panama Sugar and his friends, engage a battle with Fox Perry, the wealthy American boss who would like to purchase the island to make a Las Vegas exotic.

Cast
Scott Plank as Panama Sugar
Oliver Reed as General
Lucrezia Lante della Rovere as Liza
Vittorio Amandola as Fox Perry
Duilio Del Prete as Blue Ball
Memè Perlini as Lt. Garcia
Francesco Scimemi as Mozart
Massimiliano Ubaldi as Bad twin
Josette Martial

See also
 List of Italian films of 1990

Notes

External links

1990 films
1990 comedy films
Italian comedy films
Films set in the Caribbean
1990s Italian films